Raymond Lister (born 1959) is an Australian computer scientist and researcher on computer science education research. He was born in Casino, New South Wales and has spent most  of his life in Sydney, NSW Australia. During his research and academic career he has specialised in understanding the learning and teaching of computer programming and is an associate professor at the University of Technology, Sydney.

Lister is an ALTC Associate Fellow.

Conference Keynote Addresses 
 Toward a Developmental Epistemology of Computer Programming (WiPSCE keynote)

External links 
 UTS Profile

References 

Australian computer scientists
1959 births
Living people